This article presents a list of the historical events and publications of Australian literature during 2009.

Events
HarperCollins takes over ABC Books – the publishing arm of the Australian Broadcasting Corporation.
Caro Llewellyn, resigns as director of the new Centre for Books, Writing and Ideas (now called the Wheeler Centre) in Melbourne before taking up the role. Chrissy Sharp, the Australian general manager of Sadler's Wells Theatre in London, is appointed to take her place.
The Australia-Asia Literary Award, based in Western Australia, is suspended.

Major publications

Literary fiction

 Steven Amsterdam – Things We Didn't See Coming
 Peter Carey – Parrot and Olivier in America
 Steven Carroll – The Lost life
 Brian Castro – The Bath Fugues
 Nick Cave – The Death of Bunny Munro
 Tracy Crisp – Black Dust Dancing
 Deborah Forster – The Book of Emmett
 Andrea Goldsmith – Reunion
 Marion Halligan – Valley of Grace
 Sonya Hartnett – Butterfly
 Eva Hornung – Dog Boy
 Katherine Johnson – Pescador's Wake
 Tom Keneally – The People's Train
 Kate Legge – The Marriage Club
 David Malouf – Ransom
 Alex Miller – Lovesong
 Jennifer Mills – The Diamond Anchor
 Sonia Orchard – The Virtuoso
Susan Varga – Headlong

Children's and Young Adult fiction
 Allan Baille – Krakatoa Lighthouse
 Alyssa Brugman – Girl Next Door
 Judith Clarke – The Winds of Heaven
 Mem Fox – Hello, Baby!, The Goblin and the Empty Chair
 Paul Jennings – The Nest
 Justine Larbalestier – How to Ditch Your Fairy
 Sophie Masson – The Madman of Venice
 David Metzenthen – Jarvis 24
 Tohby Riddle – The Lucky Ones
 Sean Williams – The Scarecrow

Crime and Mystery
 Robert G. Barrett – High Noon in Nimbin 
 Sydney Bauer – Move to Strike
 Marshall Browne – The Iron Heart
 Peter Corris – Deep Water
 Garry Disher – Blood Moon
 Kathryn Fox – Blood Born
 Leah Giarratano – Black Ice
 Bronwyn Parry – Dark Country

Romance
 Michelle Douglas – The Aristocrat and The Single Mom
 Nicola Marsh – Two Weeks in the Magnate's Bed
 Katherine Scholes – The Hunter's Wife
 Maxine Sullivan – Valente's Baby

Science Fiction and Fantasy
 Trudi Canavan – The Magician's Apprentice
 Kim Falconer – The Spell of Rosette
 Pamela Freeman – Full Circle 
 Traci Harding – Being of the Field
 Deborah Kalin – Shadow Queen
 Glenda Larke – The Last Stormlord
 Juliet Marillier – Heart's Blood
 K. J. Taylor – The Dark Griffin
 Shaune Lafferty Webb – Bus Stop on a Strange Loop
 Sean Williams – The Grand Conjunction

Drama
 Angela Betzien – The Dark Room
Matt Cameron & Tim Finn – Poor Boy
 Joanna Murray-Smith – Rockabye
 Richard Tulloch – The Book of Everything
 David Williamson – Let the Sunshine

Poetry
 Emily Ballou – The Darwin Poems 
 Judith Beveridge – Storm and Honey
 Emma Jones – The Striped World
 Jennifer Maiden – Pirate Rain
 Dorothy Porter – The Bee Hut
 Peter Porter – Better Than God

Biographies
 Roger Averill – Boy He Cry: An Island Odyssey
 Stephen Cummings – Will It Be Funny Tomorrow, Billy?: Misadventures in Music
 Jacqueline Kent – The Making of Julia Gillard
 Harry M. Miller with Peter Holder – Harry M Miller: Confessions of a Not-So-Secret Agent
 Mark McKenna – Manning Clark: A Life
 Don Walker – Shots
 Jonathon Welch – Choir Man
George Whaley – Leo 'Rumpole' McKern: An Accidental Actor
 Kristin Williamson – David Williamson: Behind the Scenes

Awards and honours

Lifetime achievement

Fiction

International

National

Crime and Mystery

National

Science Fiction and Fantasy

International

National

Non-Fiction

Poetry

Drama

Deaths
 14 January – Val Vallis, poet (born 1916)
 3 June – Geoffrey C. Bingham, theological and short story writer (born 1919)
 3 July – Frank Devine, journalist (born 1931)
 6 September – Catherine Gaskin, author (born 1929)
 8 September – Rica Erickson, botanical and historical writer (born 1908)
 24 November – John West, poet (born 1951)

See also
 2009 in Australia
 2009 in literature
 2009 in poetry
 List of years in literature
 List of Australian literary awards

References

Note: all references relating to awards can, or should be, found on the relevant award's page.

Literature
Australian literature by year
21st-century Australian literature
2009 in literature